Elizabeth Bogush is an American actress. She has appeared in the main cast or regular recurring cast of a variety of television series, including NCIS: Los Angeles and Masters of Sex, as well as Titans,  October Road, Everybody Loves Raymond and The Big Bang Theory.  She was born in Perth Amboy, New Jersey.

Filmography

Film

Television

Bogush has also appeared in commercials for the text messaging service KGB.

Personal life
Bogush has been married twice. Her daughter was born in 2013.

References

External links

1977 births
Living people
American film actresses
American television actresses
Actresses from New Jersey
People from Perth Amboy, New Jersey
20th-century American actresses
21st-century American actresses